David Smith is a retired American professional mixed martial arts fighter.
Previous, David Smith was a USMTA Champion

IKF record
IKF Amateur Muay Thai Rules Light Welterweight South Mountain Regional Champion 
Las Vegas, Nevada, USA,
 
PMMA: 2-1

AKB: 10-4/0

Weight: 142

Height: 5'5"

B-Date: 1-11-88

Trainer: Nick Blungren

David Smith won his title on April 29, 2006 at the Yavapia Apache Nation in Camp Verde, Arizona, USA when he defeated Travis Sherman of Colorado Springs, Colorado, USA by unanimous decision 40-36, 40-36 and 39-38.

Mr. Smith IKF Title was retired when IKF discovered he had fought as a Pro MMA Fighter.
Last Update: 2-20-07

Mixed martial arts record

|-
| Win
| align=center| 5-1
| John Merkle
| KO (punches)
| Worlds Collide 4
| 
| align=center| 3
| align=center| 0:57
| Jean, Nevada, United States
| 
|-
| Win
| align=center| 4-1
| Ernie Calma
| KO (punch) 
| Melee on the Mountain
| 
| align=center| 2
| align=center| 0:18 
| Friant, California, United States
| 
|-
| Win
| align=center| 3-1 
| Sean Bassett
| KO (punch) 
| Strikeforce: Shamrock vs. Baroni
| 
| align=center| 2
| align=center| 1:23
| San Jose, California, United States
| 
|-
| Loss
| align=center| 2-1
| Andrew Montanez
| Decision (unanimous)
| Strikeforce: Young Guns
| 
| align=center| 3
| align=center| 5:00
| San Jose, California, United States
| 
|-
| Win
| align=center| 2-0
| Sean Bassett
| TKO (punches)
| Strikeforce: Triple Threat
| 
| align=center| 3
| align=center| 1:36
| San Jose, California, United States
| 
|-
| Win
| align=center| 1-0 
| Roscoe McClellan
| Submission (armbar) 
| RITC 78 - Back with a Vengeance
| 
| align=center| 1
| align=center| 2:47
| Glendale, Arizona, United States
|

References

External links

 MySpace

American male mixed martial artists
Living people
Year of birth missing (living people)